Aspergillus cervinus is a species of fungus in the genus Aspergillus. It is from the Cervini section. The species was first described in 1914. It has been reported to produce terremutin, dihydroxy-2,5-toluquinone, xanthocillin, and sclerin.

Growth and morphology

A. cervinus has been cultivated on both Czapek yeast extract agar (CYA) plates and Malt Extract Agar Oxoid® (MEAOX) plates. The growth morphology of the colonies can be seen in the pictures below.

References 

cervinus
Fungi described in 1914